Sagamiko or Sagami-ko may refer to:
 Lake Sagami (Sagami-ko in Japanese) in Kanagawa Prefecture, Japan
 Sagamiko, Kanagawa, a former municipality in Kanagawa Prefecture, Japan